Jørgen Tramm (born 27 April 1965) is a Danish rower. He competed in the men's eight event at the 1992 Summer Olympics.

References

External links
 

1965 births
Living people
Danish male rowers
Olympic rowers of Denmark
Rowers at the 1992 Summer Olympics
People from Esbjerg
Sportspeople from the Region of Southern Denmark